Léon Adolphe Chauvin (July 20, 1861 – June 8, 1904) was a lawyer and political figure in Quebec, Canada. Chauvin represented Terrebonne in the House of Commons of Canada from 1896 to 1900 as a Conservative.

He was born in Terrebonne, Canada East and was educated at the Collège de Montréal. In 1889, he married Berthe Gagnon. Chauvin was chief census officer for the province of Quebec in 1891. He was defeated by Raymond Préfontaine when he ran for reelection to the House of Commons in 1900.

Electoral record

References 

Members of the House of Commons of Canada from Quebec
Conservative Party of Canada (1867–1942) MPs
1861 births
1904 deaths
People from Terrebonne, Quebec